Hypolimnas octocula, the eight-spot butterfly, is a species of eggfly or diadem endemic to several islands and island chains in Oceania, including New Caledonia, Vanuatu and the Mariana Islands.

It includes the following subspecies:
 H. o. octocula Butler, 1869
 H. o. pallas Grose-Smith
 H. o. elsina Butler
 H. o. formosa Herrich-Schäffer
 H. o. marianensis

References

Octocula
Butterflies of Oceania
Butterflies described in 1869
Taxa named by Arthur Gardiner Butler